Teague Independent School District is a public school district based in Teague, Texas, United States. In 2009, the school district was rated "academically acceptable" by the Texas Education Agency.

Schools
 Teague High School (grades 9–12)
 Teague Junior High School (grades 5–8)
 Teague Elementary School (grades PK–4)

References

External links
 

School districts in Freestone County, Texas